Bronnen may refer to 

 Arnolt Bronnen (1895-1959), Austrian playwright and director
 Bronnen (Achstetten), a village in Upper Swabia, Germany